Portugal participated in the Eurovision Song Contest 2005 with the song "Amar" written by José da Ponte, Alexandre Honrado and Ernesto Leite. The song was performed by the duo 2B, which was internally selected by the Portuguese broadcaster Rádio e Televisão de Portugal (RTP) to represent the nation at the 2005 contest in Kyiv, Ukraine. 2B and "Amar" were announced as the Portuguese entry on 22 March 2005 and the song was presented to the public on 1 April 2005.

Portugal competed in the semi-final of the Eurovision Song Contest which took place on 19 May 2005. Performing during the show in position 3, "Amar" was not announced among the top 10 entries of the semi-final and therefore did not qualify to compete in the final. It was later revealed that Portugal placed seventeenth out of the 25 participating countries in the semi-final with 51 points.

Background 
Prior to the 2005 contest, Portugal had participated in the Eurovision Song Contest thirty-eight times since its first entry in 1964. The nation's highest placing in the contest was sixth, which they achieved in 1996 with the song "O meu coração não tem cor" performed by Lúcia Moniz. Following the introduction of semi-finals for the 2004, Portugal had, to this point, yet to feature in a final. Portugal's least successful result has been last place, which they have achieved on three occasions, most recently in 1997 with the song "Antes do adeus" performed by Célia Lawson. Portugal has also received nul points on two occasions; in 1964 and 1997. The nation failed to qualify to the final in 2004 with the song "Foi magia" performed by Sofia Vitória.

The Portuguese national broadcaster, Rádio e Televisão de Portugal (RTP), broadcasts the event within Portugal and organises the selection process for the nation's entry. RTP confirmed Portugal's participation in the 2005 Eurovision Song Contest on 17 November 2004. The broadcaster has traditionally selected the Portuguese entry for the Eurovision Song Contest via the music competition Festival da Canção with an exception in 1988 when the Portuguese entry was internally selected, a procedure that was held in order to select the 2005 Portuguese entry due to budget restrictions.

Before Eurovision

Internal selection 
RTP announced on 17 January 2005 that the Portuguese entry for the 2005 Eurovision Song Contest would be internally selected. On 23 February 2005, the broadcaster announced that José da Ponte, Alexandre Honrado and Ernesto Leite had been invited to create the song, while its performer would be chosen by RTP. José da Ponte had written the former Eurovision Song Contest entry "Lusitana paixão" performed by Dulce Pontes, which represented Portugal in the 1991 contest.

On 22 March 2005, "Amar" performed by the duo 2B was announced by RTP as the Portuguese entry for the 2005 Eurovision Song Contest. The duo consisted of Luciana Abreu and Rui Drumond, which participated in the second season and first season of the reality singing competitions Ídolos and Operação Triunfo, respectively, where they both placed sixth. "Amar", which was composed by Ernesto Leite and José da Ponte with lyrics by Alexandre Honrado, Ernesto Leite and José da Ponte, was planned to be presented to the public on 31 March 2005 during the RTP 70th anniversary show Gala de Aniversário RTP, however the song was presented on 1 April 2005 via the release of the official music video instead.

At Eurovision
According to Eurovision rules, all nations with the exceptions of the host country, the "Big Four" (France, Germany, Spain and the United Kingdom), and the ten highest placed finishers in the 2004 contest are required to qualify from the semi-final on 19 May 2005 in order to compete for the final on 21 May 2005; the top ten countries from the semi-final progress to the final. On 22 March 2005, a special allocation draw was held which determined the running order for the semi-final and Portugal was set to perform in position 3, following the entry from Lithuania and before the entry from Moldova. At the end of the show, Portugal was not announced among the top 10 entries in the semi-final and therefore failed to qualify to compete in the final. It was later revealed that Portugal placed seventeenth in the semi-final, receiving a total of 51 points. The semi-final performance was known for its overall technical mishaps, including Luciana Abreu's faulty microphone.

In Portugal, the two shows were broadcast on RTP1 and RTP Internacional with commentary by Eládio Clímaco. The Portuguese spokesperson, who announced the Portuguese votes during the final, was Isabel Angelino.

Voting 
Below is a breakdown of points awarded to Portugal and awarded by Portugal in the semi-final and grand final of the contest. The nation awarded its 12 points to Belgium in the semi-final and to Romania in the final of the contest.

Points awarded to Portugal

Points awarded by Portugal

References

2005
Countries in the Eurovision Song Contest 2005
Eurovision